Kevin McCurley (2 April 1926 – May 2000) was an English professional footballer who played as a forward.

Career
Born in Consett, McCurley began his career with non-league Worthing. He moved to Brighton & Hove Albion and scored 9 goals in 21 league appearances, before being recruited by Liverpool. He made no league appearances for Liverpool and was sold to Colchester United for £750. He made 224 league appearances in eight years with the U's, scoring 92 goals. He was released in 1960 and made one appearance for Oldham Athletic. He then returned to non-league football. Kevin McCurley died in May 2000.

References

External links
 
 Kevin McCurley at Colchester United Archive Database

1926 births
2000 deaths
Association football forwards
English footballers
Worthing F.C. players
Brighton & Hove Albion F.C. players
Liverpool F.C. players
Colchester United F.C. players
Oldham Athletic A.F.C. players
Tonbridge Angels F.C. players
English Football League players